Caldwell Township may refer to the following places in the United States:

 Caldwell Township, Appanoose County, Iowa
 Caldwell Township, Michigan
 Caldwell Township, Callaway County, Missouri
 Fairfield Township, Essex County, New Jersey, formerly known as Cadwell Township

Township name disambiguation pages